Trakai Castle might refer to three separate castles in Lithuania:

 Trakai Island Castle, located on an island in Lake Galvė
 Trakai Peninsula Castle, located on a peninsula of Lake Galvė
 Senieji Trakai Castle, located in Senieji Trakai, 4 km southeast from Trakai